The 1998 Bowling Green Falcons football team was an American football team that represented Bowling Green University in the Mid-American Conference (MAC) during the 1998 NCAA Division I-A football season. In their eighth season under head coach Gary Blackney, the Falcons compiled a 5–6 record (5–3 against MAC opponents), finished in a tie for third place in the MAC East Division, and were outscored by all opponents by a combined total of 312 to 292.

The team's statistical leaders included Bob Niemet with 949 passing yards, Godfrey Lewis with 753 rushing yards, and Kurt Gerling with 656 receiving yards.

Schedule

References

Bowling Green
Bowling Green Falcons football seasons
Bowling Green Falcons football